The canton of Dompierre-sur-Besbre is an administrative division in central France. At the French canton reorganisation which came into effect in March 2015, the canton was expanded from 9 to 32 communes:
 
Avrilly
Beaulon
Le Bouchaud
La Chapelle-aux-Chasses
Chassenard
Chevagnes
Chézy
Coulanges
Diou
Dompierre-sur-Besbre
Le Donjon
Gannay-sur-Loire
Garnat-sur-Engièvre
Lenax
Loddes
Luneau
Lusigny
Molinet
Monétay-sur-Loire
Montaiguët-en-Forez
Montcombroux-les-Mines
Neuilly-en-Donjon
Paray-le-Frésil
Pierrefitte-sur-Loire
Le Pin
Saint-Didier-en-Donjon
Saint-Léger-sur-Vouzance
Saint-Martin-des-Lais
Saint-Pourçain-sur-Besbre
Saligny-sur-Roudon
Thiel-sur-Acolin
Vaumas

Demographics

See also
Cantons of the Allier department 
Communes of France

References

Cantons of Allier